The Admiral Sir Harry Rawson Cup, commonly known as "The Rawson Cup", was presented to the Sydney University Sports Union in 1906 by Admiral Sir Harry Rawson, GCB, KCMG, Governor of New South Wales (1902–1909). The Rawson Cup is the pinnacle of male intercollegiate sport at the University of Sydney. The cup is fought for by men representing each of the four colleges with male undergraduate students; St Andrew's College, St John's College, Wesley College and St Paul's College. In addition, postgraduate men of Sancta Sophia College compete in rowing, swimming, and athletics.

It is contested over the academic year and consists of 8 sports:
‍Rowing
‍Swimming
‍Athletics
‍Rugby
‍Basketball
‍Tennis
‍Cricket
‍Soccer

Previously Shooting was a Rawson Cup sport but this was replaced by Basketball in 1975. Soccer was introduced as a Rawson Cup sport in 1993. At the conclusion of each sport points are awarded; five [5] for first place, three [3] for second place, one [1] for third place and none [0] for fourth place. At the conclusion of the last sport the leader in the points score wins the Rawson Cup.

St Andrew's College have won the Cup more than all other colleges combined and possess the longest continuous winning streak of eight years (1991 to 1998). St John's College have only won the Cup once, in 1974.

Prior to the donation of the Rawson Cup, there was a sport played between the men's colleges at the University of Sydney on an informal basis from about 1892.

The system used to determine the winner of the cup has a rather tangled history. Intercollegiate delegates have argued for many years over the interpretation of the word "challenge". Prior to 1922, the holder was determined on a first-place only basis, though half a point was awarded to each of the two colleges involved in a tied win in a sport. From 1922 second places were taken into consideration in the event in the event of two colleges obtaining an equal number of first places. In 1948, after consulting the University Of Sydney Sports Union, Intercol introduced the 5:3:1:0 scoring system, where points are shared in case of a draw.

The challenge principle was held to be still preserved in that the college holding the cup had to be defeated on points to relinquish it. In 1960, 1978, 1996 and 2020, when St Andrew's and St Paul's were equal on points, St Andrew's retained the cup although both names were inscribed on it. The award of the cup is considered valid even if all the sports are not contested, such as in 1946 when rowing and shooting were not contested.

During the two world wars, there were self-imposed restrictions on college sports and so the award of the Rawson Cup during those years was discontinued, although some informal sport did take place.

References

Sport at the University of Sydney